Eslida is a municipality located in the province of Castellón, Valencian Community, Spain.

Municipalities in the Province of Castellón
Plana Baixa